Anani Mohamed (born 10 February 1992) is a former American-Guyanese professional soccer player who most recently played for C.D. Universidad de El Salvador.

References

1992 births
Living people
Soccer players from San Francisco
Guyanese footballers
Guyanese expatriate footballers
Guyana international footballers
American soccer players
American sportspeople of Guyanese descent
Temple Owls men's soccer players
Virginia Tech Hokies men's soccer players
Expatriate footballers in El Salvador
Guyanese expatriate sportspeople in El Salvador
Association football wingers